Bread has been a staple food in Switzerland for millennia, probably since the dawn of agriculture, the Swiss Plateau being the main cereal region of the country.

Nowadays, bread is consumed by all Swiss and accompanies practically every meal, therefore it makes an integral part of Swiss cuisine. There are several hundreds of different Swiss breads, owing to the diversity of culture and traditions found in the country.

This list includes both national, regional and sweet breads.

Swiss breads

National breads
 Burebrot
 Bürli (Ballon)
 Schlumbergerli
 Weggli (Petits pains, panini)
 Zopf
 Zürcher Murren
 Zürcher Brot (Langbrot)

Regional breads

 Basler Brot (BS/BL)
 Brascidèla (GR)
 Pane ticinese (TI)
 Paun jauer (Münstertaler Brot) (GR)
 Pain de seigle (VS)
 Rua-Brot (FR)
 Spanischbrötli (AG/ZH)
 St. Galler Brot (SG)
 Türggenbrot (SG) Urner Brot (UR)

Sweet breads
 Bröötis (AI)
 Cuchaule (FR)
 Grittibänz (Bonhomme de Saint Nicolas)

Breads with religious significance
 Agathabrot (FR)
 Motschellen (AI)

References

External links
List of breads (and pastries) in the Culinary Heritage of Switzerland

 
Lists of breads
Breads